Stelis atwoodii is a species of orchid plant native to Costa Rica.

References 

atwoodii
Flora of Costa Rica
Plants described in 2001